Poštanska štedionica (full legal name: Banka Poštanska štedionica a.d. Beograd) is one of the largest operating banks in Serbia. It was founded in 1921 and its headquarters are located in Belgrade, Serbia. As of April 2022, it is the sole bank operating on the Serbian market that is majority owned by the Government of Serbia.

History
Poštanska štedionica (meaning "Post's savings service") was founded on 26 June 1921 in Palilula, Belgrade when the law of postal savings service was implemented. By 1926 it became the main financial savings institution in Kingdom of Yugoslavia, with branches in all postal offices in the entire county. By then, it practiced a policy of financial transactions free of any taxes, intended to motivate the population to save capital.

A period of technological implementation followed. In 1969 the offices are equipped with the first IBM computers. Also, Poštanska štedionica became the first financial institution in all of SFR Yugoslavia to introduce the credit cards. In 2002 Poštanska štedionica becomes a fully operational bank, and, in 2006, it changes its name to Banka Poštanska štedionica a.d. It was admitted to the free market in Belgrade Stock Exchange on February 7, 2006.

In October 2013, Serbian Ministry of Finance proposed to the government that bank takes over all insured and uninsured deposits and parts of assets of the majority state-owned Privredna banka Beograd which has lost licence for banking. Later, in late January 2014, another state-owned Univerzal banka has lost its licence and Poštanska štedionica took their clients.

In April 2021, Poštanska štedionica acquired minor mts banka. In October 2021, Poštanska štedionica acquired former subsidiary of Komercijalna banka in Bosnia and Herzegovina.

Market data
At the end of 2017, Poštanska štedionica's total assets reached 1.185 billion euros.

On June 2, 2014, the share of Banka Poštanska štedionica Beograd was worth 25,754 RSD (222.87 EUR)2. It had its highest price, i.e. 90,000 RSD (778.85 EUR), on May 17, 2007 and its lowest price, i.e. 3,800 RSD (32.88 EUR), on May 5, 2009.

The capital of Banka Poštanska štedionica Beograd is wholly owned by legal entities, 49.57% of which by JP PTT saobraćaja Srbija and 47.85% by the Serbian State.

See also
 List of banks in Serbia
 Belgrade Stock Exchange

References

External links
 Official website

Banks of Serbia
Banks established in 1921
Companies based in Belgrade
Postal savings system
Serbian brands
1921 establishments in Serbia